"Magic Fountain" is a song released by Australian electronic band Art vs. Science as a radio single in June 2010. It was released as the lead single from their second EP of the same name. Sales towards the track counted toward the EP; however, the song charted at number 17 on the ARIA Digital Track Chart.

In the Triple J Hottest 100, 2010, the song was voted at number 9.

The video, directed by Alex Roberts, was nominated for the ARIA Award for Best Video at the ARIA Music Awards of 2010.

Charts

Release history

References

2010 songs
2010 singles